Campanula scabrella is a species of bellflower known by the common name rough bellflower. It is native to the mountains of the western United States, where it grows in talus and other rocky alpine habitat. This is a tough perennial herb growing in a clump from a woody rhizome and rarely exceeding 5 centimeters in height. The stiff leaves are linear to narrowly oval in shape and about 3 centimeters long, borne on winged petioles. The small funnel-shaped flower is just under a centimeter long and pale blue or lavender in color, arising from the leaf clump on an erect  pedicel about a centimeter tall.

External links
Jepson Manual Treatment
USDA Plants Profile
Photo gallery

scabrella
Alpine flora